Gabrielle Simpson (born 17 October 1992), also known as Gabi Simpson, is an Australia netball international. Simpson was vice-captain of the Australia team that won the silver medal at the 2018 Commonwealth Games. Simpson was also a member of the Queensland Firebirds teams that won the 2015 and  2016 ANZ Championships. Since 2017, Simpson has captained Firebirds in Suncorp Super Netball. In 2017 she received the Liz Ellis Diamond award.

Early life and education
Simpson is originally from Sydney's Eastern Suburbs, growing up in Randwick and, in 2010, graduating from St Catherine's School, Waverley. Between 2010 and 2016 she completed a Bachelor of Physiotherapy. She started her degree at the University of Sydney but switched to the University of Queensland after joining Queensland Firebirds.

Playing career

New South Wales
Simpson played for teams representing Randwick, Baulkham Hills and Parramatta Auburn. Between 2009 and 2012, she represented New South Wales at under-17, under-19 and under-21 levels in the Australian National Netball Championships. In 2010 she was a member of the under-19 team that were runners up. In 2011 she was a member of both the under-19 and under-21 tournament winning teams. She was also named the under-19 tournament Most Valuable Player. In 2012 she won a third tournament with the under-21 team.

Australian Netball League
Between 2010 and 2012, Simpson played in the Australian Netball League. In 2010 and 2011 she played for NNSW Blues and in 2012 she played for the Australian Institute of Sport.

New South Wales Swifts
Simpson was included in the 2012 New South Wales Swifts squad as a temporary replacement player.

Queensland Firebirds
Since 2013, Simpson has played for Queensland Firebirds, initially in the ANZ Championship and later in Suncorp Super Netball. Between 2013 and 2016, she played in four successive grand finals for Firebirds, helping the team win two premierships in 2015 and 2016. Since 2017, Simpson has captained Firebirds in Suncorp Super Netball. In 2017 Simpson received the Liz Ellis Diamond award.

Australia
Simpson made her senior debut for Australia on 20 October 2015 against New Zealand during the first test of the 2015 Constellation Cup series . Between 2009 and 2012 she had represented Australia at under-17, under-19 and under-21 levels. She also represented Australia at the 2013 and 2014 Fast5 Netball World Series. Simpson was vice-captain of the Australia team that won the silver medal at the 2018 Commonwealth Games.

Honours
Australia
Netball Quad Series
Winners: 2016, 2017 (January/February), 2018 (September), 2018 (January), 2019 
Runners Up: 2017 (August/September)
Commonwealth Games
Runners Up: 2018
Queensland Firebirds
ANZ Championship
Winners: 2015, 2016
Runners Up: 2013, 2014
New South Wales
Australian National Netball Championships
Winners: Under-19 (2011), Under-21 (2011, 2012)
Runners Up: Under-19 (2010)

References

External links
 

1992 births
Living people
Australian netball players
Australia international netball players
Australia international Fast5 players
Netball players at the 2018 Commonwealth Games
Commonwealth Games silver medallists for Australia
Commonwealth Games medallists in netball
Netball players from Sydney
Queensland Firebirds players
New South Wales Swifts players
Netball New South Wales Blues players
Australian Institute of Sport netball players
Suncorp Super Netball players
ANZ Championship players
Australian Netball League players
University of Queensland alumni
Queensland state netball league players
Medallists at the 2018 Commonwealth Games